Timmapur is a village in the Gadag district of Karnataka State in India.

Demographics
Per the 2011 Census of India, Timmapur has a total population of 3077; of whom 1564 are male and 1513 female.

Transport 
Timmapur is 20 km from Gadag. The nearest railway station is in Harlapur, Gadag.

See also 
 Lakkundi
 Kanavi
 Kanaginahal
 Yarehanchinal
 Gadag

References 

Villages in Gadag district